Ponch could refer to:

 Poonch District, Pakistan
 A character in the American television series CHiPs
 A beer belly
 A tool for hand-laundry, also known as a Posser

See also
Poncho